Arthur Bartholomew (3 December 1833 Bruton, Somerset – 19 August 1909 Melbourne) was an English-born Australian engraver, lithographer and natural history illustrator. He was the son of Thomas Bartholomew, a builder, and Charlotte Wright.

Bartholomew was apprenticed to an engraver in Exeter and acquired some lithographic training. He sailed for Australia aboard the Oriental in 1852, arriving in Melbourne in December 1852. Here he spent some time exploring the outback before sailing to Tasmania, where he was to meet his future wife, Eliza Ann Nicholls.

Returning to Melbourne, he became assistant to William Blandowski, producing illustrations for an encyclopedia on the natural history of Australia. Blandowski became involved in a dispute with fellow members of the Philosophical Institute when he named two new fish species after two of the members. This in itself was not unusual, but when he used phrases such as 'slimy', 'slippery', 'low forehead' and 'big belly' in his descriptions, turmoil ensued. Bartholomew made use of the hiatus to travel to Longford in Tasmania, where he married Eliza in 1856. They produced two children – Christianna in 1857 and Ethelinda in 1858, and then returned to Melbourne, where they produced a further six children - Arthur Hubert in 1861, Emma Edith in 1863, Eliza Maud in 1865, Jessie Charlotte in 1867, Hubert Marion in 1870 and Arthur Percy in 1872.

On 1 September 1859 Arthur was appointed Attendant to Frederick McCoy in the department of Natural History at the newly established Melbourne University. For the next six months he diligently attended McCoy's lectures and worked in his laboratory. Bartholomew was given increasing responsibility as McCoy became aware of his artistic talents and the potential of his contribution to future projects.

Bartholomew started on a series of zoological and geological illustrations, laying the groundwork for the "Prodromus of the Zoology of Victoria" and "Prodromus of the Palaeontology of Victoria". In the next forty years he illustrated some 700 natural history specimens.

Gallery

References

External links
Google Art Project

1833 births
1909 deaths
Australian engravers
Australian natural history illustrators
English emigrants to colonial Australia